Le téléphone sonne (The phone's ringing) is a current affairs  programme produced by the French generalist public radio network France Inter and broadcast between 7:20pm and 8.00pm on Monday to Friday evenings. 

First aired in 1978, the programme consists of a live studio debate between specialist guests on a selected item in the news, to which listeners are invited to contribute by phoning in their questions and opinions – hence the programme's title. The journalist Alain Bédouet was the main presenter of Le téléphone sonne from 1984 to 2012.

External links
The programme's home page

French public radio programs
Radio France
1978 radio programme debuts
French talk radio programs